Wanquan is a town under the administration of Qionghai, Hainan, China. , it has two residential communities and 16 villages under its administration.

References 

Township-level divisions of Hainan
Qionghai